Zena Maria Cardman (born October 26, 1987) is an American geobiologist and NASA astronaut.

Early life and education
Cardman was born on October 26, 1987. She received a Bachelor of Science degree in Biology from the University of North Carolina at Chapel Hill, where she majored in Biology, minored in Chemistry and Marine Sciences, and wrote an Honors thesis in Creative Writing. 

Cardman's research took her to remote field sites from the Arctic to Antarctic, and included multiple offshore expeditions on board research ships. While at the University of North Carolina, Cardman studied biogeochemistry in hydrocarbon seeps and hydrothermal vents. During that time, she also worked with the Palmer Long-Term Ecological Research Network in Antarctica. She completed a Master of Science degree with the research group of Dr. Andreas Teske.  

During her early career, Cardman supported NASA research in British Columbia, Idaho, and Hawaii, developing operational architectures for planetary EVA. She has sailed as an Assistant Engineer with the Sea Education Association, working in the engine room of a brigantine. At the time of her selection in June 2017, Cardman was a National Science Foundation Graduate Research Fellow and Doctoral Candidate in Geosciences at Pennsylvania State University, studying geobiology and novel redox couples in Earth's subsurface.

NASA career
Prior to her astronaut candidacy, Cardman worked in science and operations for the NASA Pavilion Lake Research Project (2008–2015) and BASALT (2016–2017). In June 2017, she was selected as a member of NASA Astronaut Group 22, and began her two-year training at Johnson Space Center in Houston.

Personal life
Her hobbies include rock climbing, caving, poetry, and power lifting.

Awards and honors
Cardman has received numerous academic awards, including a National Science Foundation Graduate Research Fellowship, Royster Society Distinguished Graduate Fellowship, Chancellor's Award (UNC Chapel Hill) for Most Outstanding Senior Woman, and Space Grant Consortium Fellowships.

References

External links 

 Zena Cardman's website

American astronauts
People from Urbana, Illinois
Living people
1987 births
Women astronauts
University of North Carolina at Chapel Hill alumni
Penn State College of Earth and Mineral Sciences alumni
People from Williamsburg, Virginia
American microbiologists